Indeterminate Line is a 1987 oxidized steel public art sculpture by Bernar Venet, measuring 58 inches high by 60 inches by 64 inches, installed in Beverly Hills, California.  A later 2004 version is installed outside Denver's Colorado Convention Center at Speer Boulevard, in the U.S. state of Colorado. It was installed at a cost of US$600,000.

References

2004 sculptures
Outdoor sculptures in Denver
Outdoor sculptures in California
Culture of Beverly Hills, California